The 2013 Shanghai Shenhua season was Shanghai Shenhua's 10th season in the Chinese Super League and 51st overall in the Chinese top flight. They also competed in the Chinese FA Cup losing in the third round.

Players

First team squad
Updated 4 March 2013.

Reserve squad

Transfers

Winter

In:

Out:

Competitions

Chinese Super League

Results summary

Results by round

Results

Table

Chinese FA Cup

Squad statistics

Appearances and goals

|}

Top scorers

References

Shanghai Shenhua F.C. seasons
Shanghai Shenhua F.C.